Pointless is a British television quiz show produced by Banijay subsidiary Remarkable Television for the BBC. It is hosted by Alexander Armstrong. In each episode four teams of two contestants attempt to find correct but obscure answers to four rounds of general knowledge questions with the winning team eligible to compete for the show's cash jackpot. All questions used on the show are factual in nature and are asked of a panel of 100 individuals in a pre-conducted public survey. A correct answer scores one point for each survey subject who gave it and the objective is to achieve as low a score as possible. "Pointless" answers are correct responses that were not given by anyone surveyed, score zero points and are the most desirable. Every pointless answer given during the main game increases the jackpot by £250 and the team that reaches the final round has three chances to win it by giving one such answer.

Pointless debuted on BBC Two on 24 August 2009. The success of its first three series led the BBC to move it to BBC One from 2011. From late June to mid-July, the programme usually takes a two-week break to make way for the Wimbledon Tennis Championships. On occasions when BBC1 carries live broadcasts of major news or sport events, the programme is transferred to BBC2, for example during the pandemic of 2020. , the programme is airing its 28th series and has had peak audience figures of over 7 million viewers. An offshoot of the show entitled Pointless Celebrities was first shown in 2011 and  had reached series 15. The format has been exported internationally.

On 8 April 2022, Richard Osman announced that he would step down as co-presenter of the series to focus more on his writing career, although he will still co-present with Armstrong on Pointless Celebrities on a short-term contract before leaving the series fully. Rotating guest-presenters will take his place until a new permanent presenter is found.

Gameplay 
Teams of two contestants attempt to provide answers that are not only correct, but also as obscure as possible. The programme initially featured five teams per episode, but the field was later reduced to four. On each episode, contestants answer a series of questions that were put to 100 members of the general public in a previously conducted online survey, which had a time limit of 100 seconds. Once a question is asked at the start of a round, the contestants are given details as to what constitutes a valid answer. If a team's answer is correct, they score one point for each participant who gave it during the survey; an answer given by none of the participants is termed "pointless" and adds nothing to the team's score. If the answer is incorrect, the team scores the maximum of 100 points. Once a question or pass is complete, depending on the specific format of the round, any remaining pointless answers are stated along with the high-scoring answers given in the survey, usually the top three.

The game begins with two elimination rounds, in which teams must achieve as low a score as possible. The rounds are scored independently of one another, and the team with the highest score in each round is eliminated from the game. If two or more teams are tied for the highest score in either of these rounds, a "lockdown" tiebreaker is played among them, using the last question from the round and the same scoring rules. If the score remains tied, an "emergency question" is asked to break it. In the third "Head-to-Head" round, the two surviving teams compete against each other to find low-scoring answers; the first team to win two questions moves on to the final round.

Teams may return to the programme until they have either reached the final round once or been eliminated in three consecutive episodes, whichever occurs first. The team that reaches the final round is awarded a pair of trophies to keep. They must then supply three responses to a question with many correct answers (e.g. name films directed by a specified director, or name a song by a specified singer). If any of the answers is pointless, they win the jackpot as it stands for that game; otherwise, the money rolls over to the next show.

The jackpot increases by £250 for every pointless answer given in any round except the final. If a team reaches the final but fails to win the jackpot, the whole amount is rolled over to the next game and increased by £1,000.  the highest recorded jackpot won on the show was £24,750 on 8 March 2013. Once the jackpot is won, the amount is reset to £1,000. For the celebrity version, the jackpot is set at £2,500 and increases by £250 for each pointless answer found, while special editions have the jackpot set at £5,000 and increased by £500 for each pointless answer found; in neither version does the jackpot roll over to another show. Instead for Pointless Celebrities, £500 is awarded to each of the four pairings.

Prior to series 25, teams became ineligible to return after appearing on two consecutive episodes or reaching the final once, whichever occurred first. This rule was relaxed for the programme's 1,000th episode, in which four past jackpot-winning teams were invited to compete again.

Elimination rounds
During an elimination round, teams aim to score as few points as possible. Each round consists of a question derived from a subject with each member of a team required to give an answer during a pass; each round consists of two passes and teams must decide who will play which pass before the question is asked. Teammates may not confer on answers during the round. Order of play for the first pass is determined by random draw in the first round and by ascending order of first-round scores in the second. For the second pass in each round, the order of play is reversed.

After both passes are complete, the team with the highest score for the round is eliminated from the game. In the event of a tie for high score, the affected teams are allowed to confer and offer one more answer to the question as a tiebreaker. If the scores remain tied after this pass, the question is thrown out and a new one is played. All scores are reset to zero at the beginning of Round 2.

Six different formats for the questions have been used during the programme's run for the elimination rounds in each game:

 Open-Ended – Contestants are given the question and have free choice of what answer to give. In Series 1, this format was used three times in this round, before subsequent episodes used it no more than once. A modified version of this format is sometimes used in which the contestants must name items that belong to any of several sub-categories (e.g. given a list of acronyms, choose one and state the word represented by any one of its letters).
  Possible Answers – Introduced in Series 2, contestants are given a board of potential answers to a question and must each pick one, attempting to find the obscure ones on the board and avoid picking out a wrong answer. Each pass consists of two boards, each possessing at least one pointless answer and one incorrect answer, the latter usually having some indirect link (often humorous) with the question. This format allowed categories to be used in which no commonly agreed definitive list of correct answers might exist. It was discontinued following the end of Series 5, but revived as a bonus round midway through Series 23.
 Clues and Answers – Introduced in Series 3, contestants are given a list of clues related to the topic of the question, whereupon they must select a clue and provide the correct answer connected to it. An example of this format is that a list could contain the names of different battles and the questions requires a contestant to name the country in which it occurred (e.g., "the Battle of Hastings" – "England"). Although the round follows a similar style to that of the "Possible Answers" format, there is no guarantee that contestants may find a pointless answer from within the list. If a team answers incorrectly, that clue remains in play and can be chosen again. The number of clue/answer pairs is always three more than the number of teams playing a round, and a new board is used on each pass.
 Linked Categories – Introduced in Series 5, each pass consists of two closely related categories; one team member provides an answer related to the first category while the other provides an answer to the second category. The format follows the same principles as that of the "Open-ended" format, but was rarely used and was later discontinued after the series.
 Picture Board – Introduced in Series 7, contestants are shown a grid of pictures or items and must identify one at a time. In some cases, the pictures have some of the letters in their correct answers filled in and/or serve as clues to items that must be named.
 Part Identification - Introduced in Series 24, contestants are shown seven items and four groups into which they must be sorted (e.g. given a list of seven parts of the human head, decide whether each is found in the brain, ear, eye, or mouth). Each contestant selects one item and must identify the group to which it belongs. As in "Clues and Answers," a new board is played on each pass, and an incorrect guess leaves that item available to opponents.

As of Series 25, the most common format for the elimination rounds involves "Clues and Answers" for one and either "Open-Ended" or "Picture Board" for the other. For all formats except "Open-Ended" and "Picture Board", the last contestant or team to play on a particular board is invited to answer as many remaining items as they wish before selecting one to use on that turn.

Head-to-head
The two remaining teams compete against each other, answering questions with the intention of finding the lowest scores possible. Both teams can now confer and the winning team of this round moves on to the Final. The format of this round has differed, as listed below:
 Series 1 – The teams take turns providing one answer to a question at a time and attempting to score as few points as possible. The lower-scoring team from the elimination rounds chooses one of two categories to be played. Each team is given an equal number of turns; if at least one team has exceeded 100 at the end of a pass, the round ends and the lower-scoring team wins.
 Series 2–5 – Both teams compete in a multi-question best-of contest; best-of-five for the Series 2 and best-of-three from the Series 3. Each team must give an answer to a question and once both have done so, the lower score of the two wins the question and earns that team a point. Each question will usually have a minimum of four answers to choose from and the order of play is that the team who acquired the fewest points in the elimination rounds gets to answer first on the first question.
 Since Series 6 – Both teams compete in a multi-question best-of-three contest; while the format is the same since Series 3, all questions have five answers with each team choosing one. Questions follow one of three formats: Picture Board (occasionally using sound cues or with some letters of the correct answer filled in); Clues and Answers; or answers that have been scrambled/anagrammed or had some of their letters removed. Both teams may choose the same item if the second team to play believes that the first has answered incorrectly. The second team is invited to fill in as many missing answers as they can before choosing one.

Midway through Series 23, a new round was added to give the contestants more opportunities to increase the jackpot. It is played between the second elimination round and the head-to-head and is similar to the previously retired "Possible Answers" format. Both pairs of contestants are shown a question and six possible answers. Two of the answers are pointless, two are also correct but score some points and the other two are incorrect (often with a tangential and humorous link to the question). Each pair may offer one answer with no risk of elimination and all four contestants may confer with one another if desired. Any chosen pointless answers add £250 to the jackpot.

Final
The last remaining team receives a pair of trophies to keep regardless of what happens in the Final Round and now attempts to win the game's jackpot. The team chooses one category from a list, whereupon the host reads a series of questions associated with it that have multiple correct answers (e.g. characters in the play King Lear or films starring Emily Watson). The contestants have 60 seconds to discuss the questions, after which they must jointly give three answers. If any individual answer is pointless, the team wins the jackpot; otherwise, it is rolled over to the next show.

Originally, contestants could choose from one of three categories with unused ones remaining in the list for five days or until they were selected and had to provide answers to a single question within the chosen category. This format was used between Series 1 and Series 5. The number of available categories was increased to five at the start of Series 6 then reduced to four in Series 9. By the start of the second half of Series 9, the round was modified to require the contestants to provide answers to any or all of three questions connected to their chosen category. They must specify which question they are attempting with each of their three answers and can only win the jackpot if any answer is pointless for its nominated question.

Pointless Celebrities 
Following the success of Pointless and its transfer to BBC One, the BBC commissioned a celebrity edition of the programme, entitled Pointless Celebrities. Much like the main show, Pointless Celebrities has teams of two celebrities competing against each other to win the jackpot for their chosen charities, and has the same gameplay as the regular show.

Unlike the main series, the jackpot does not roll over and always starts at £2,500, with every Pointless answer adding £250 to the jackpot, as with the main series, but this may be doubled on some occasions. £500 is always donated to every team who fails to either reach the final or win the jackpot, and any money won by a team is split equally between the two charities represented by its members.

Pointless Celebrities is broadcast within a prime-time slot on Saturday nights and features some differences in how the game works. Celebrities are allowed to return in more than one episode with the same partner or a different partner, and episodes tend to have a theme in regards to the celebrity contestants that took part - for example, a celebrity edition aired in December 2015 consisted of celebrities who were made famous on reality television shows like Big Brother and Made in Chelsea.

Some editions of the show end with a guest performance.

Development
The show's format (originally to be called "Obviously") was conceived by Tom Blakeson, Simon Craig, David Flynn, Nick Mather, Richard Osman and Shaun Parry, producers at Endemol UK, in 2009. They envisaged it as a "reverse Family Fortunes....rewarding obscure knowledge, while allowing people to also give obvious answers....a quiz which could be sort of highbrow and populist simultaneously". Osman was not intended to be co-presenter; originally, he filled the role only as part of a demonstration laid on for the BBC. However, the BBC executives asked him to continue when they commissioned the first series. Osman then approached comedian Alexander Armstrong to be the main presenter; the two men had been peers during their university days. Armstrong, who the previous year had been lined up to present Channel 4's Countdown only to back out for fear of being pigeonholed as a presenter, agreed to present what was perceived as a lower-profile show, with the presence of Osman helping to convince him.

In 2016, Richard Osman told the Belfast Telegraph, "It's never been a show that's had posters, or trailers, and it's presented by these two slightly inept guys. Everyone who's ever watched it feels like it's their programme. We've never changed it, but have always done it in the same way, which is slightly shoddy, enjoying ourselves." On the programme's future, he said, "Every programme has a shelf-life, but as long as people are enjoying it, we will stick with it. If Channel 4 wanted to offer three times as much money, we wouldn't take it. We would stay with the BBC. We love the BBC. Pointless is not for sale. We owe the BBC an enormous debt, because they've looked after us."

After series 27, Richard Osman resigned from the regular series (remaining as co-presenter on Pointless Celebrities) and for series 28 is replaced by six presenters in rotation: Sally Lindsay, Alex Brooker, Lauren Laverne, Stephen Mangan, Konnie Huq and Ed Gamble. Series 29 will add Vick Hope, Gyles Brandreth, Ria Lina, Andi Oliver, Nish Kumar, Lucy Porter, Rose Matafeo and Sally Phillips to the rotation.

Transmissions

Regular editions

Celebrity editions

Note: On 27 November 2022, Pointless Celebrities aired a BBC 100 Years edition, and was counted as series 16, episode 1

Specials

The first series aired on BBC Two between August and October 2009, with the corporation announcing on the day of the final episode's broadcast that it had commissioned a second series. The series' audience had peaked at 1.69 million viewers, 17.2% of audience share for the timeslot, while averaging around 1 million viewers per episode. The second series saw audiences grow modestly; the format was tweaked prior to the start of series three, reducing the number of rounds and giving more time for banter between the hosts which had previously been edited out. The change saw strong viewer growth, and the show was moved to the BBC's main channel BBC One in 2011. By 2013, the programme records four episodes in one day, and averaged 3.6 million viewers daily, gaining more viewers than ITV game show The Chase, which airs in roughly the same time slot.

In February 2014, Pointless was extended for another 204 episodes, giving three more series, taking the total commissioned to 13 in February 2014. A further 24 celebrity episodes were also ordered. For the 1,000th episode, which aired on 16 January 2017, Armstrong and Osman traded host and assistant duties, and four previous couples who had distinguished themselves in various ways were invited to compete again. The jackpot for this episode began at £2,500 (the usual starting value for Pointless Celebrities), and every pointless answer during the main game added £1,000 to it. On 23 February 2016, it was announced that the show had been recommissioned by the BBC to make 165 more regular daytime editions along with 45 prime-time celebrity specials, taking Pointless to the end of 2017. On 4 September 2017, it was announced that the BBC had commissioned a further 204 episodes, including 165 regular and 39 celebrity specials.

With the start of the 11th series of Pointless Celebrities on 23 December 2017, the show's set design was changed, with some new graphics, and an updated intro replaced the one used since the show's debut. This extended to the 19th series of Pointless, which started on 2 April 2018.

International broadcast
In Australia, Pointless has aired on both BBC UKTV (series 10 and 11) and ABC (series 9–11, as of April 2017).
As of the 19 July 2021 it is aired on the Nine Network at 2pm weekdays.

Awards and nominations

Kelvin MacKenzie controversy 
Following a news-themed edition of Pointless Celebrities which aired on 27 October 2014, several fans criticised the presence of former The Sun editor Kelvin MacKenzie, who was responsible for the newspaper's infamous front-page report concerning the 1989 Hillsborough disaster. Osman responded to this criticism with at least twenty comments on Twitter, stating that he had not known MacKenzie would appear until "about an hour before" recording, and that he had "strongly argued against it".

International versions 
Legend:  Currently airing as of February 2021    No longer airing  

An American version was set to be developed by GSN in 2017. A pilot episode presented by Alison Sweeney as her assistant was Doug Mirabello was produced by Endemol Shine America and never aired.

Merchandise

App Games
On 26 February 2014, Endemol's in-house app-publishing division released the official Pointless app, Pointless Quiz, was released for iOS, with an iPad, Android and an Amazon version released a few months later. The Pointless app features animated versions of Alexander Armstrong and Richard Osman, and allows the player to tackle questions in a similar format to the TV show.

In October 2018, Vocala released an Amazon Alexa Skill based on the show.

Books
Five books have been released of the show: The 100 Most Pointless Things in the World, The 100 Most Pointless Arguments in the World, The Very Pointless Quiz Book (not to be mistaken for The Pointless Book), The A-Z of Pointless: A brain-teasing bumper book of questions and trivia and "A Pointless History of the World". All five were released by Coronet. In the books, Armstrong and Osman give their insight into pointless matters.

Board Games
Three editions of the official board game have also been released, plus two mini-sized versions, each of which contains updated questions. All of them were published by University Games.

In popular culture 
Pointless appeared in the BBC sitcom Not Going Out (Series 7, Episode 5); Armstrong and Osman both played themselves. Pointless was also parodied in several sketches of the satirical show Newzoids, in which a caricature of Osman interrupts people in regular situations with phrases used in the game show.

References

External links 

 
 Pointless Celebrities
 
 

 
2009 British television series debuts
2000s British game shows
2010s British game shows
2020s British game shows
BBC television game shows
English-language television shows
Television series by Banijay
Television shows shot at Elstree Film Studios